San Dimas may refer to:
San Dimas Municipality, Durango, Mexico
San Dimas, California, United States
San Dimas (reserve), a biosphere reserve and experimental forest in southern California
San Dimas Dam, in California, United States
San Dimas (guitar), model of electric guitar made by Charvel

See also
 Saint Dismas or the penitent thief